The Women's 10 metre air rifle pairs event took place at 9 October 2010 at the CRPF Campus.

Results

External links
Report

Shooting at the 2010 Commonwealth Games
Common